SIW or Siw may refer to:
 Substrate-integrated waveguide, a synthetic rectangular electromagnetic waveguide formed in a dielectric substrate
 Self-inflicted wound, the act of harming oneself where there are no underlying psychological problems related to the self-injury
 siw, the ISO 639 code for the Siwai language
 SIW, the IATA code for Sibisa Airport  
 SIW, the ICAO airline code for Sirio Executive

People 
 Siw Malmkvist, a Swedish schlager singer and actress
 Siw Hughes, a Welsh actress
 Siw Anita Andersen, a Norwegian actress and comedian
 Siw Wittgren-Ahl, a Swedish social democratic politician

See also 
 Siv (given name)